This is a list of Nudibranchia of Ireland. It is part of the List of marine molluscs of Ireland.

Order NUDIBRANCHIA

Goniodoris castanea Alder & Hancock, 1845
Goniodoris nodosa Montagu, 1808
Okenia elegans Leuckart, 1828
Okenia leachii Alder & Hancock, 1854
Ancula gibbosa Risso, 1818
Trapania pallida Kress, 1968
Onchidoris bilamellata Linnaeus, 1767
Onchidoris depressa Alder & Hancock, 1842
Onchidoris muricata O F Müller, 1776
Onchidoris oblonga Alder & Hancock, 1845
Onchidoris pusilla Alder & Hancock, 1845
Onchidoris sparsa Alder & Hancock, 1846
Diaphorodoris luteocincta M Sars, 1870
Acanthodoris pilosa Abildgaard in O F Müller, 1789
Adalaria loveni Alder & Hancock, 1862
Adalaria proxima Alder & Hancock, 1854
Crimora papillata Alder & Hancock, 1862
Aegires punctilucens Orbigny, 1837
Polycera faeroensis Lemche, 1929
Polycera quadrilineata O F Müller, 1776
Greilada elegans Bergh, 1894
Limacia clavigera O F Müller, 1776
Palio dubia M Sars, 1829
Palio nothus Johnston, 1838
Thecacera pennigera Montagu, 1813
Cadlina laevis Linnaeus, 1767
Aldisa zetlandica Alder & Hancock, 1854
Rostanga rubra Risso, 1818
Doris sticta Iredale & O'Donoghue, 1923
Archidoris pseudoargus Rapp, 1827
Geitodoris planata Alder & Hancock, 1846
Jorunna tomentosa Cuvier, 1804
Armina loveni Bergh, 1860
Janolus cristatus delle Chiaje, 1841
Janolus hyalinus Alder & Hancock, 1854
Proctonotus mucroniferus Alder & Hancock, 1844
Tritonia hombergii Cuvier, 1803
Tritonia lineata Alder & Hancock, 1848
Tritonia nilsodhneri Marcus, 1983
Tritonia plebeia Johnston, 1828
Lomanotus genei Verany, 1846
Lomanotus marmoratus Alder & Hancock, 1845
Scyllaea pelagica Linnaeus, 1758 Vagrant
Hancockia uncinata Hesse, 1872
Dendronotus frondosus Ascanius, 1774
Doto coronata Gmelin, 1791
Doto cuspidata Alder & Hancock, 1862
Doto dunnei Lemche, 1976
Doto eireana Lemche, 1976
Doto fragilis Forbes, 1838
Doto hystrix Picton & Brown, 1981
Doto koenneckeri  Lemche, 1976
Doto lemchei Ortea & Urgorri, 1978
Doto maculata Montagu, 1804
Doto millbayana Lemche, 1976
Doto pinnatifida Montagu, 1804
Doto tuberculata Lemche, 1976
Embletonia pulchra Alder & Hancock, 1844
Coryphella browni Picton, 1980
Coryphella gracilis Alder & Hancock, 1844
Coryphella lineata Lovén, 1846
Coryphella verrucosa M Sars, 1829
Flabellina pedata Montagu, 1815
Flabellina pellucida Alder & Hancock, 1843
Tergipes tergipes Forsskål, 1775
Catriona gymnota Couthouy, 1838
Cuthona amoena Alder & Hancock, 1845
Cuthona caerulea Montagu, 1804
Cuthona concinna Alder & Hancock, 1843
Cuthona foliata Forbes & Goodsir, 1839
Cuthona genovae O'Donoghue, 1926
Cuthona nana Alder & Hancock, 1842
Cuthona pustulata Alder & Hancock, 1854
Cuthona rubescens Picton & Brown, 1978
Cuthona viridis Forbes, 1840
Eubranchus doriae Trinchese, 1874
Eubranchus exiguus Alder & Hancock, 1848
Eubranchus farrani Alder & Hancock, 1844
Eubranchus pallidus Alder & Hancock, 1842
Eubranchus tricolor Forbes, 1838
Eubranchus vittatus Alder & Hancock, 1842
Cumanotus beaumonti Eliot, 1906
Fiona pinnata Eschscholtz, 1831 Vagrant
Calma glaucoides Alder & Hancock, 1854
Facelina annulicornis Chamisso & Eysenhardt, 1821
Facelina auriculata O F Müller, 1776
Facelina bostoniensis Couthouy, 1838
Facelina dubia Pruvot-Fol, 1949
Caloria elegans Alder & Hancock, 1845
Favorinus blianus Lemche & Thompson, 1974
Favorinus branchialis Rathke, 1806
Dicata odhneri Schmekel, 1967
Aeolidia papillosa Linnaeus, 1761
Aeolidiella alderi Cocks, 1852
Aeolidiella glauca Alder & Hancock, 1845
Aeolidiella sanguinea Norman, 1877

References
J.D. Nunn and J.M.C. Holmes A catalogue of the Irish and British marine Mollusca in the collections of the National Museum of Ireland ~ Natural History, 1835-2008
P. J. Hayward and J. S. Ryland Eds., 1999 The Marine Fauna of the British Isles and North-West Europe: Volume II: Molluscs to Chordates Oxford University Press 
Howson, C.M. & Picton, B.E.(eds) 1997. The species directory of the marine fauna and flora of the British Isles and surrounding seas.Ulster Museum and The Marine Conservation Society, Belfast and Ross-on-Wye. Also as CD ROM
Gofas, S.; Le Renard, J.; Bouchet, P. (2001). Mollusca, in: Costello, M.J. et al. (Ed.) (2001). European register of marine species: a check-list of the marine species in Europe and a bibliography of guides to their identification. Collection Patrimoines Naturels, 50: pp. 180-213

External links
Roche C., Clarke S. & O’Connor B. (2005) Inventory of Irish marine wildlife publications. Irish Wildlife Manuals, No. 16. National Parks and Wildlife Service, Department of Environment, Heritage and Local Government, Dublin, Ireland.

Identification
Pruvot-Fol A., 1954 Mollusques Opisthobranches. Faune de France n° 58 460 p., 1 pl., 173 fig. PDF (21 Mo)

Fauna of Ireland
Ireland